Arik Gilrovich is a former Israeli footballer and manager.

Managerial statistics

References

External links
Official website

1960 births
Living people
Israeli Jews
Israeli footballers
Hapoel Ramat Gan F.C. players
Maccabi Sha'arayim F.C. players
Maccabi HaShikma Ramat Hen F.C. players
Hapoel Rishon LeZion F.C. managers
Hapoel Ramat Gan F.C. managers
Footballers from Ashkelon
Association football forwards
Israeli football managers
Association football defenders